is a side-scrolling platform game by Hudson Soft released for the Super Nintendo Entertainment System in 1992 and later re-released for the Wii's Virtual Console download service in 2011. It was the first Adventure Island game released for the SNES and came out between the releases of the NES games Adventure Island II and Adventure Island 3. It was later followed by Super Adventure Island II. The game's soundtrack was composed by Yuzo Koshiro.

An unrelated game also titled  was released for mobile phones between 2004 in Japan and 2005 in North America. It is a remake of Wonder Boy: Monster Land, which was previously ported to the PC Engine by Hudson as Bikkuriman World.

Plot
Over the course of his adventures, Master Higgins managed to maintain the peace and tranquility of his home, the mystical Adventure Island, and even earned the love and support of the local "Miss Jungle", the lovely Tina (erroneously called "Jeannie Jungle" in English materials). At nighttime, the young hero was quietly enjoying a well-deserved rest with his grateful girlfriend Tina loyally leaning on his side atop a treetop (said to be stargazing in the English manual). When the warmth of Tina's soft touch suddenly becomes a chilling coldness, he turns around and is shocked to find that the evil sorcerer, Dark Cloak, used a spell to turn Tina into a stone statue for eternity. Dark Cloak retreats to the legendary Ice Mountain across the sea, and Higgins resolves to defeat the wicked sorcerer in order to restore her to life.

The player controls Higgins as he travels his way through five stages with four areas each. The first three areas in each stage has Higgins fighting his way through an obstacle course, fighting many traps and enemies, in order to reach the goal ball. The final area in each stage consists of a boss battle.

Gameplay
Other than the improved visuals and audio as a result of the switch of hardware to the SNES, the rules of the game are not much different from the original Adventure Island. Although released shortly after Adventure Island II for the NES, Master Higgins' dinosaur companions are not present in this installment. However, Higgins now has a choice between two weapons: the standard stone axe from previous games and a boomerang (which was later introduced in Adventure Island 3). Whereas the axe can only be tossed left or right, Higgins can shoot the boomerang in four directions (up and down, as well as left and right). When Higgins first picks a weapon, he can only toss one shot at a time. By picking up the same weapon in a row, Higgins can toss up to three shots consecutively. When Higgins picks a fourth weapon of the same kind, his shots will turn into fireballs, which are more powerful and capable of destroying stones. At this point, when the player switches from axes to boomerangs or vice versa, the fireball effect will remain in place until the player loses a life. While Higgins has lost the ability to run faster in this game, he has gained the ability to crouch, which can be followed up with a super-jump. During gameplay, Master Higgins must collect tropical fruit in order to keep his life bar from depleting; he also can acquire a skateboard which will allow him to travel across the stage faster.

Other media
Super Adventure Island is one of the video games featuring in the manga titled Cyber Boy, by Nagai Noriaki, Published by Coro Coro Comic and Shogakukan, from 1991 to 1993.

Reception

Allgame gave a rating of 4.5 out of 5 noting the game has the same gameplay as the game’s predecessor with better graphics and a more varied soundtrack and the game has a variety of challenges although giving criticism on the main character’s slow movement and limited jumping concluding "the game is an enjoyable adventure nonetheless". Super Gamer reviewed the SNES version and gave an overall score of 42% writing: "This sounds great and doesn’t look too bad, but gameplay is irksome with your large sprite coming a cropper all too often. Ugh!" In 2018, Complex placed Super Adventure Island 80th in their "The Best Super Nintendo Games of All Time".

References

External links
 Takahashi-Meijin no Daibōken Jima on the Wii Virtual Console website 

1992 video games
Adventure Island (franchise)
Platform games
Produce! games
Super Nintendo Entertainment System games
Video games developed in Japan
Video games scored by Yuzo Koshiro
Virtual Console games
Single-player video games
Hudson Soft games
Video games set on uninhabited islands